Tha Teng is a district (muang) of Sekong province in southeastern Laos.

References

Districts of Sekong province